Silvia Montefoschi (1926 – 2011) was an Italian Jungian psychoanalyst.

Montefoschi was born in Rome. She started studying psychoanalysis after the degree in medicine and in biology. She was a student of Ernst Bernhard, (in turn student of Jung). She was distinguished, since her first works, for an interpretation in dialectical key of the Jungian thought.

From the vision of the psychoanalytic relationship as an intersubjective evolutionary relationship, she theorized the universal meaning of the human cognitive experience as process of self-consciousness and evolution of the being.

After 1977, she began focusing on issues of intersubjectivity in a unified reading of the history of psychoanalysis from Sigmund Freud to Carl Jung and to this day, applying the "principle of individuation" to the same psychoanalysis and its history.

Selected works
Her books constitute an organic work of knowledge of the reality, that goes over to know psychoanalytic:

 L'uno e l'altro. Interdipendenza e intersoggettività nel rapporto psicoanalitico, The one and the other (1977);
 Over the border of the person (1979);
 Dialectics of the unconscious (1980);
 Over the taboo of the incest (1982);
 The system man: catastrophe and renewal (1985);
 Carl Jung: un pensiero in divenire (1985)
 To Be the being (1986);
 The cosmic principle or of the taboo of the incest (1987);
 From the one to the one, over the universe (1998).
 Opere 1 - Il senso della psicoanalisi. Da Freud a Jung e oltre (2004)
 Il manifestarsi dell'essere in Silvia Montefoschi (2009) by Silvia Montefoschi, Bianca Pietrini and Fabrizio Raggi

Theater
 La storia vera dell'amore, The true story of love (1998), screenplay by Silvia Montefoschi, music by Giuseppe Lo Forte
 Lucifero dinamica divina, Lucifer dynamic divine (2000), screenplay by Silvia Montefoschi, music by Giuseppe Lo Forte

Poetry
 Fu una pioggia di stelle sul mio viso (1952)

Stories
 La rivoluzione radicale del reale (1996)
 Scherzo in attesa della fine del mondo (1996)

See also

 Analytical psychology (or Jungian psychology) in Italy
 Intersubjectivity
 Intersubjective psychoanalysis

References

External links
Silvia Montefoschi (documents in the network) by Andrea Morelli
Silvia Montefoschi biography
Talk with Silvia Montefoschi after the terrorist attack of September 11 to the Twin Towers in New York (2001)
"Maternal role and personal identity - On the women's movement and psychoanalysis" (1978) by Silvia Montefoschi

Bibliography
 Open Library page

Associations:
	Center of Evolutionary Intersubjective Psychology An association of Italian Jungian psychoanalysts who promote research and study in Analytic Psychology, especially regarding evolutionary aspects of the personality and intersubjective and relational method in psychoanalysis. Also studies the development of Jungian theory, such as the research of Silvia Montefoschi in Italy.(English version)
GEA Association - Analytical Psychology and Experimental Philosophy Italian Jungian psychoanalysts web site. Documents and interviews with Silvia Montefoschi about intersubjectivity concept in psychoanalysis.

1926 births
2011 deaths
Italian psychiatrists
Italian women psychiatrists